Addis Continental Institute of Public Health (AC-IPH) is an independent center for public health research and training. It was established in mid-2006 by health experts to provide technical services and training in major health issues in Africa. The institute is based in Addis Ababa, Ethiopia. And currently has opened a new branch in Bahir Dar, Ethiopia.

References

External links
 Addis Continental Institute of Public Health official website

Medical and health organisations based in Ethiopia
Universities and colleges in Ethiopia
Education in Addis Ababa
2006 establishments in Ethiopia